

Unadilla class

Octorara class

Kansas class

Sassacus class

Mohongo class

Alert class

Other  

USS Pompanoosuc

 
 

  

Steam gunboats
Steam gunboats list
USN